Side Trips is the 1967 debut studio album by American band Kaleidoscope. It was released in June 1967, on Epic Records BN 26304, and re-released on vinyl by Sundazed Records (2007). The album has a raw, non-limited instrumental mentality, for each member played many instruments; for example, David Lindley played guitar, banjo, fiddle, and mandolin, and Solomon Feldthouse played saz, bouzouki, dobro, vina, oud, doumbek, dulcimer, fiddle, guitar, and vocals.

Background
After forming in 1966, the group known then as The Kaleidoscope, won a recording contract with Epic Records. They first recorded a single "Please" backed by a non-album track "Elevator Man", that was released in December 1966. The album Side Trips was released in June 1967, and an additional single was released with album cut "Why Try" backed by non-album track "Little Orphan Nannie". The album combined rock & roll with roots and world music, and contained several traditional songs including Charlie Poole's "Hesitation Blues" and Cab Calloway's signature song "Minnie the Moocher". Among other cuts, bassist Chris Darrow contributed a couple of trippy songs, "If the Night" and "Keep Your Mind Open", while Solomon Feldthouse contributed an Eastern influenced "Egyptian Gardens". Soon after the release, they re-named themselves as simply Kaleidoscope.

Reception

Allmusic's retrospective review praised nearly all of the individual songs and called the album "arguably the most diverse effort of 1967", but concluded that enthusiasts and collectors would be better off getting the more comprehensive Pulsating Dreams anthology, which includes the entirety of Side Trips.

Track listing

"Egyptian Gardens" (Solomon Feldthouse) – 3:08
"If the Night" (Chris Darrow) – 1:51
"Hesitation Blues" (Charlie Poole) – 2:27
"Please" (Feldthouse, Mark Freedman) – 3:18
"Keep Your Mind Open" (Darrow) – 1:56
"Pulsating Dream" (Darrow, Feldthouse, David Lindley) – 2:16
"Oh Death" (Dock Boggs) – 3:25
"Come on In" (Traditional, arranged by David Lindley) – 2:07
"Why Try" (Lindley) – 3:39
"Minnie the Moocher" (Cab Calloway, Clarence Gaskill, Irving Mills) – 2:15

Personnel

Musicians
David Perry Lindley – banjo, fiddle, mandolin, guitar, harp guitar, 7-string banjo
David Solomon Feldthouse – saz, bouzouki, resonator guitar, veena, goblet drum, dulcimer, fiddle, twelve-string guitar
Chris Darrow – bass, banjo, mandolin, fiddle, autoharp, harmonica, clarinet
Fenrus Epp – violin, viola, bass, piano, organ, harmonica
John Vidican – percussion

Technical
Barry Friedman – producer
Mike Goldberg – production supervisor
Arnold Shaw – liner notes

References

External links

1967 debut albums
Kaleidoscope (American band) albums
Epic Records albums